Lunatia is a genus of predatory sea snails, marine gastropod mollusks in the family Naticidae, the moon snails.

The species in this genus have been brought in synonymy mostly with Euspira

Torigoe & Inaba (2011) provided a rather arbitrary assignment of species to respectively Euspira and Lunatia and this has been at one time uploaded in the WoRMS classification. However this is not based on any in-depth phylogenetic analysis and has proved inconsistent when some closely related European species (e.g. Euspira guillemini, E. macilenta) were then not congeneric. Until a substantiated phylogenetic hypothesis is published for the group, Lunatia is here considered a junior subjective synonym of Euspira and all the species accepted under Euspira, following in this Marincowich (1977), Kabat (1991) and the Malacolog database.

Species
Species within the genus Lunatia include:
 Lunatia abyssicola (E.A. Smith, 1896): synonym of Euspira abyssicola (E. A. Smith, 1896)
 Lunatia agujana (Dall, 1908): synonym of Euspira agujana (Dall, 1908)
 Lunatia alderi (Forbes, 1838): synonym of Euspira pulchella (Risso, 1826)
 Lunatia bransfieldensis Preston, 1916: synonym of Amauropsis bransfieldensis (Preston, 1916)
 Lunatia catena (da Costa, 1778): synonym of Euspira catena (da Costa, 1778)
 Lunatia choshiensis Tiba, 1985: synonym of ''Euspira pallida (Broderip & G.B. Sowerby I, 1829)
 Lunatia crawfordiana (Dall, 1908): synonym of Euspira crawfordiana (Dall, 1908)
 Lunatia draconis Dall, 1903: synonym of Glossaulax draconis (Dall, 1903)
 Lunatia fringilla (Dall, 1881): synonym of Euspira fringilla (Dall, 1881)
 Lunatia fusca (Blainville, 1825): synonym of Euspira fusca (Blainville, 1825)
 Lunatia gilva (Philippi, 1851): synonym of Laguncula pulchella Benson, 1842
 Lunatia grossularia (Marche-Marchad, 1957): synonym of Euspira grossularia (Marche-Marchad, 1957)
 Lunatia guilleminii (Payraudeau, 1826): synonym of Euspira guilleminii (Payraudeau, 1826)
 Lunatia heros (Say, 1822): synonym of Euspira heros (Say, 1822)
 Lunatia intermedia (Philippi, 1836): synonym of Euspira nitida (Donovan, 1804)
 Lunatia levicula (A. E. Verrill, 1880): synonym of Euspira levicula (A. E. Verrill, 1880)
 Lunatia lewisii (Gould, 1847): synonym of Neverita lewisii (Gould, 1847)
 Lunatia litorina (Dall, 1908): synonym of Euspira litorina (Dall, 1908)
 Lunatia macilenta (Philippi, 1844): synonym of Euspira macilenta (Philippi, 1844)
 Lunatia monilifera (Lamarck, 1822): synonym of Euspira catena (da Costa, 1778)
 Lunatia montagui (Forbes, 1838): synonym of Euspira montagui (Forbes, 1838)
 Lunatia monterona (Dall, 1919): synonym of Euspira monterona Dall, 1919
 Lunatia nitidia auct. non Donovan, 1800: synonym of Euspira nitida (Donovan, 1804)
 Lunatia nux Okutani, 1964: synonym of Euspira nux (Okutani, 1964)
 Lunatia pallida (Broderip & G.B. Sowerby I, 1829): synonym of Euspira pallida (Broderip & Sowerby, 1829)
 Lunatia pardoana (Dall, 1908): synonym of Euspira pardoana (Dall, 1908)
 Lunatia pila (Pilsbry, 1911): synonym of Euspira pila (Pilsbry, 1911)
 Lunatia plicispira Kuroda, 1961: synonym of Euspira plicispira (Kuroda, 1961)
 Lunatia poliana (Della Chiaje, 1826): synonym of Euspira pulchella (Risso, 1826)
 Lunatia sordida (Philippi, 1844): synonym of Euspira fusca (Blainville, 1825)
 Lunatia tenuis (Récluz, 1851): synonym of Euspira tenuis (Récluz, 1851)
 Lunatia tenuistriata (Dautzenberg & H. Fischer, 1911): synonym of Euspira tenuistriata (Dautzenberg & H. Fischer, 1911)
 Lunatia triseriata (Say, 1826): synonym of Euspira triseriata (Say, 1826)
 Lunatia yokoyamai (Kuroda & Habe, 1952): synonym of Euspira yokoyamai (Kuroda & Habe, 1952)

References

 Backeljau, T. (1986). Lijst van de recente mariene mollusken van België [List of the recent marine molluscs of Belgium]. Koninklijk Belgisch Instituut voor Natuurwetenschappen: Brussels, Belgium. 106 pp.
 Vaught, K.C. (1989). A classification of the living Mollusca''. American Malacologists: Melbourne, FL (USA). . XII, 195 pp.

External links
 Kabat A. R. (1991). The classification of the Naticidae (Mollusca Gastropoda). Review and analysis of the supraspecific taxa. Bulletin of the Museum of Comparative Zoology 152: 417-449

Naticidae